John Ethan Hill (October 15, 1865 – July 2, 1941) was an American mathematician and college football coach.  He served as the eighth head football coach for West Virginia University in Morgantown, West Virginia and he held that position for the 1900 season.  His coaching record at West Virginia was 4–3.

Hillwas born in Mystic, Connecticut in 1865. He graduated from Yale University in 1885 and received a PhD from Clark University.

He died on July 2, 1941 at Brooklyn, New York. He was buried at Elm Grove Cemetery in Mystic.

Head coaching record

References

1865 births
1941 deaths
West Virginia Mountaineers football coaches
Clark University alumni
Yale University alumni
People from Mystic, Connecticut
19th-century American mathematicians
20th-century American mathematicians